Argyle Heir is a studio album by the American indie pop band the Ladybug Transistor. It was released on May 22, 2001, via Merge Records.

Critical reception
The Austin American-Statesman wrote that "these Brooklyn nerds are at their best when they keep it simple, as on 'Echoes', a twangy number that sounds like an outtake from the Byrds' Sweetheart of the Rodeo, or on 'Going Up North', a waltz instrumental with warm Mellotron tones and, uh, sleigh bells (which make several appearances throughout the record)."

Track listing
 "Fires On The Ocean"
 "Echoes"
 "Perfect For Shattering"
 "Going Up North (Icicles)"
 "Wooden Bars"
 "Catherine Elizabeth"
 "Nico Norte"
 "Words Hang In The Air"
 "Fjords Of Winter"
 "In A Certain Place"
 "Brighton Bound"
 "The Reclusive Hero"
 "The Glass Pane"
 "Caton Gardens"

Personnel 
 Gary Olson - vocals and trumpet
 Jeff Baron - guitar
 Jennifer Baron - bass guitar
 Sasha Bell - vocals, piano, organ and flute
 San Fadyl - drums
 Julia Rydholm - violin

References

2001 albums
The Ladybug Transistor albums
Merge Records albums